Agrarian socialism is a political ideology that promotes “the equal distribution of landed resources among collectivized peasant villages”. This socialist system places agriculture at the center of the economy instead of the industrialization efforts found in urban settings. Seen as more progressive in terms of social orientation, many agrarian socialist movements have tended to be rural (with an emphasis on decentralization and non-state forms of collective ownership), locally focused and traditional. The emphasis of agrarian socialists is therefore on social control, ownership and utilization of the means of production (such as farms) in a rural society. Additionally, principles like community, sharing and local ownership are emphasized under agrarian socialism. For instance, in rural communities in post-Soviet Russia “social organization of labor in the peasant household is based upon highly dense networks of mutual trust and interdependences” that diminished the need for manager-employee styles of labor. Nationalist ideology can also be seen coupled with agrarian socialist ideology, sometimes serving as the foundation for peasant-led revolutions. For instance, nationalist propaganda from the fledging Chinese communist party during the Sino-Japanese war era, “furthered the mobilization of the masses and helped determine the form this mobilization took”.

A 17th-century movement called the Diggers based their ideas on agrarian communism.

Russian populist tradition and the Socialist Revolutionary Party 

The Socialist Revolutionary Party was a major political party in early 20th century Russia and a key player in the Russian Revolution. After the February Revolution of 1917 it shared power with liberal, social democratic, and other socialist parties within the Russian Provisional Government. In November 1917, it won a plurality of the national vote in Russia's first-ever democratic elections (to the Russian Constituent Assembly) but by this time the soviets controlled the country and the Bolsheviks were able to maneuver and eliminate the other parties within the soviets including the Socialist Revolutionaries, seizing power, sparking the Russian Civil War and subsequent persecution.

The party's ideology was built upon the philosophical foundation of Russia's narodnik–Populist movement of the 1860s-70s and its worldview developed primarily by Alexander Herzen and Pyotr Lavrov. After a period of decline and marginalization in the 1880s, the Populist/narodnik school of thought about social change in Russia was revived and substantially modified by a group of writers and activists known as "neonarodniki" (neo-Populists), particularly Viktor Chernov. Their main innovation was a renewed dialogue with Marxism and the integration of some of the key Marxist concepts into their thinking and practice. In this way, with the economic spurt and industrialization in Russia in the 1890s, they attempted to broaden their appeal in order to attract the rapidly growing urban workforce to their traditionally peasant-oriented program. The intention was to widen the concept of the "people" so that it encompassed all elements in the society that were opposed to the Tsarist regime.

The party's program was both socialist and democratic in nature; it garnered much support among Russia's rural peasantry, who in particular supported their program of land-socialization as opposed to the Bolshevik program of land-nationalization—division of land among peasant tenants rather than collectivization in authoritarian state management. Their policy platform differed from that of the Russian Social Democratic Labour Parties—both Bolshevik and Menshevik—in that it was not officially Marxist (though some of its ideologues considered themselves such); the SRs believed that the "laboring peasantry", as well as the industrial proletariat, were both revolutionary classes in Russia whereas the Bolsheviks considered the industrial proletariat to be exclusively revolutionary. Whereas Russian SDs defined class membership in terms of ownership of the means of production, Chernov and other SR theorists defined class membership in terms of extraction of surplus value from labor. On the first definition, small-holding subsistence farmers who do not employ wage labor are, as owners of their land, members of the petty bourgeoisie; on the second definition, they can be grouped with all who provide, rather than purchase, labor-power, and hence with the proletariat as part of the "laboring class". Chernov nevertheless considered the proletariat the "vanguard", with the peasantry forming the "main body" of the revolutionary army.

Agrarian socialism in Latin America

Landless Rural Workers' Movement of Brazil 
Founded in January of 1984, the Landless Rural Workers' Movement of Brazil, was a socialist movement looking to challenge the status quo and promote the rights of labor over capital. Getting their start from the land gifted to them by the Catholic and Lutheran churches, members of this movement's first priority was to attain permanence on their settled land. Once settled, various MST branches were legitimized under the “social function” component of the Republic of Brazil’s constitution, meaning that their contributions to society were recognized by the government. Next, the MST looked for a way to promote their socialist values. The answer came in the form of collectivization, taking inspiration from cooperatives found in Cuba. One MST leader stated “Only agricultural cooperation would allow settlements to best develop their production, introduce the division of labor, allow access to credit and new technologies…”. However, they did not find immediate success as the rationalization of labor in these settlements sparked a great deal of tension between members.  Factors such as the inability to become profitable and the paralleled behaviors between landlords and administrators of the cooperatives stagnated the progress of the MST. However, a reevaluation of the MST’s ideals helped them refocus their struggle. First was the reintroduction of Campones tradition which placed the good of the family or community at center of decisions made on the farms. They also substituted large-scale production and rationalization of labor for subsistence farming which allowed for a less rigid organization of labor. The MST also partook in communal living, another significant element of Campones culture that encouraged families on the same cooperatives to live closely with one another. Finally, money earned by the cooperative was reinvested into the settlement to help sustain their farming technology, healthcare, and educational facilities amongst other things. The success of this rebrand created a number of opportunities for the MST. For example, in 1992 the Confederation of Agrarian Reform Cooperatives of Brazil provided the organization with support on a national level for things like education, technical training, and organizational support. The following year the MST established its first cooperative training course which became a part of the Technical Institute of Training and Research on Agrarian Reform. Furthermore, by 2008 “the MST had helped establish 161 cooperatives of various kinds, including 140 agro-industries”. Additionally, the MST collaborated with the Brazilian government to create economic stability in their settlements through the Food Acquisition Program, which requires 30% of milk served to Brazilian public Schools to be bought from agrarian reform settlements.

Cuban agrarian socialism 
Leading up to the revolution of July 26th, both the Cuban government and Cuban citizens, especially those involved with agriculture, were heavily discontent with the sugar trade. Under this capitalist system, American enterprises claimed land previously belonging to small farmers for their own agricultural monopolies. Poverty, unemployment, and illiteracy grew tenfold, but Cubans did not have the means to stop it without causing severe harm to their economy. However, the success of the revolution resulted in a resurgence of peasant-favoring and socialist ideals in Cuba. This was a part of the anti-imperial and anti-colonial campaign promoted by the newly established Republic of Cuba. Under this new government, both the Agrarian Reform Law of 1959 and the Agrarian Reform Law of 1963 were enacted. These laws acted as a catalyst for social and economic reform as they allowed for land to be redistributed amongst thousands of peasants and abolished foreign ownership of rural lands. Previously corporate-owned farms were soon turned over to small family farmers or obtained by the state for their own mass food production purposes. Cooperative farms were another product from this period of reform, allowing small farms to group together. This strengthened the voice and power of the agricultural population in Cuba when it came to the political sphere. These cooperatives were also highly effective with over 75% becoming profitable in 1990 compared to 27% of state-owned farms claiming the same profitability. As time progressed more land was given to small-farmers with state-sponsored farms in Cuba occupying 82% of cultivated land in 1988, but only 19.9% of cultivated land 2018.

Huasteco agrarian socialism 
Indigenous Huastecan culture positioned community and local ownership above all else. Sharing resources and farming for the entire village was a normal occurrence in daily life. Due to Spanish colonization and continued imperialization from other countries, this way of life fell under great duress. Huastecos lost the rights to their land and faced a caste system in which they were placed at the bottom. In the 19th century, creole and mestizo Mexican elites oppressed Huastecans by expropriating their land and privatizing it for their own political goals. This included building railroads and other capital-accumulating developments. The process of socialist radicalization for Huastecan peasants largely came from nationalist sentiments that arose after armed conflicts. After fighting in the Mexican independence war, and fighting against the U.S. and French in their respective invasions, Huastecan’s developed a sense of identity as Mexican citizens. They further developed another facet of their identity from the oppression they faced from other Mexicans. A combination of radicalization efforts by anarchists from Mexico City and Socialist priests, for instance, Padre Mauricio Zavala, and oppression from the creole and mestizo elite helped Huasteacans develop their peasant class consciousness. Their national and class identities fused together creating the spirit of rebellion based on the principles of abolishing private property, reclaiming land rights, obtaining access to government representation, and other civil liberties. The Huasteco people spread their ideology using pamphlets, books, and flags. The final root of the peasant revolution of 1879 occurred in 1876 when General Porfirio Diaz enlisted the help of peasants to overthrow the current president Sebastian Lerdo de Tejada in exchange for the return of peasant land rights. However, he betrayed them, choosing to implement liberal reforms that strengthened private property laws and further persecuted Huastecans instead. Other peasant groups, for instance, the Morelo people of Mexico experienced the same fate as the Huastecans under the dictatorship rule of Porfirio Diaz. These peasant groups combined their strengths and began a new socialist revolution that would abolish “any new revolutionary government that failed to address the needs of Mexico’s impoverished and politically excluded rural population…”.

See also
 Agrarianism
 Collective farming
 Collectivization in the Soviet Union
 Democratic Kampuchea
 Eco-socialism
 Geolibertarianism
 Georgism
 Land reform
 Localism (politics)
 Maoism
 Types of socialism
 Zapatismo

References

Footnote

Bibliography 

 Botella-Rodriquez, Elisa and Angel Gonzalez-Esteban. Past and Present Land Reform in Cuba (1959–2020): From Peasant Collectivization to Re-peasantization and Beyond. Rural History 32, no. 2 (2021) 249-264. https://doi.org/10.1017/S0956793321000108
 
 Diniz, Aldiva.S and Bruce Gilbert. Socialist Values and Cooperation in Brazil's Landless Rural Workers' Movement. Latin American Perspectives 40, no. 4 (2012): 19–34. https://doi.org/10.1177/0094582X13484290.
 Hart, Paul. Bitter Harvest: The Social Transformation of Morelos, Mexico, and the Origins, of the Zapatista Revolution 1840-1910. Albuquerque: University of New Mexico Press, 2005.
 Johnson, Chalmers A. Peasant Nationalism and Communist Power: The Emergence of Revolution China 1937-1945. Stanford: Stanford University Press, 1962.
 O’Brien, David J., Stephen K. Wegren, Valeri V. Patsiorkovski.  Contemporary Rural Responses to Reform from Above. The Russian Review 63, no 2 (2004) 256-276. https://doi.org/10.1111/j.1467-9434.2004.00316.x
 Saka, Mark Saad. For God and Revolution: Priest, Peasant, and Agrarian Socialism in the Mexican Huasteca. Albuquerque: University of New Mexico Press, 2013. eBook Collection (EBSCOhost).

Further reading 

 
 
 
 

 
Green politics
Political theories
Socialism